Kırca can refer to the following villages in Turkey:

 Kırca, Acıpayam
 Kırca, Ayvacık
 Kırca, Bigadiç
 Kırca, Gümüşhacıköy
 Kırca, Sultandağı